Brian Gottfried and Paul McNamee were the defending champions but they competed with different partners that year, Gottfried with Mike Leach and McNamee with Pat Cash.

Gottfried and Leach lost in the first round to Andy Kohlberg and David Pate.

Cash and McNamee won in the final 6–4, 6–3 against Bernard Mitton and Butch Walts.

Seeds

Draw

Final

Top half

Bottom half

External links
1984 Stella Artois Championships Doubles Draw

Doubles